This list comprises all players who have been placed on a regular-season roster for Boston Breakers (WPS) since the team's first Women's Professional Soccer season in 2009.  This list does not include pre-season training rosters, short term players, or discovery players who do not appear for the club.

Notable former players
Canadian striker Christine Latham was the Breakers first international player.

  Candace Chapman (2009)
  Angela Hucles (2009)
  Kristin Luckenbill (2009)
  Heather Mitts (2009)
  Amy Rodriguez (2009)
  Kelly Schmedes (2009)
  Kristine Lilly (2009–10)

All-time statistics

Key

References

External links
 Boston Breakers 2009 regular season statistics

Players
 
Boston Breakers (WPS) players
Association football player non-biographical articles
Lists of American sportswomen
Boston-related lists
Boston Breakers players